Rankin Octagonal Barn is a historic octagonal barn located near Silverton, Jackson County, West Virginia. It was built about 1890, and is an eight-sided frame structure covered with vertical wide board siding. Each side of the octagon measures 24 feet in length.  It features a central cupola to provide light and ventilation.

It was listed on the National Register of Historic Places in 1985.

References

Barns on the National Register of Historic Places in West Virginia
Octagon barns in the United States
Infrastructure completed in 1895
Buildings and structures in Jackson County, West Virginia
National Register of Historic Places in Jackson County, West Virginia
Barns in West Virginia